The 2015 Clare Senior Hurling Championship was the 120th staging of the Clare Senior Hurling Championship since its establishment by the Clare County Board in 1887.

The defending champions and holders of the Canon Hamilton Cup were Cratloe who won their second ever title. This formed part of a historic first Clare Senior Championship 'Double' since Ennis Dalcassians in 1929, which was completed when they defeated Éire Óg, Ennis in the football final the following weekend.

In 2012 it was decided that from 2014 onwards the heretofore separate Clare Senior A and Senior B Hurling Championships would be merged into a single sixteen-team senior hurling championship. This meant that five clubs would lose their senior status and be relegated down to the Clare Intermediate Championship. The fifteen remaining clubs would be joined by the 2013 intermediate champions to form the new single tier format. However due to the success of the Clare Senior and Under-21 squads in 2013, the culling of the senior hurling championship was postponed for twelve months.

A mini Senior B championship will still be held for those clubs that avoid relegation but don't qualify for the quarter-finals.

Senior Championship Fixtures/Results

First round
 Eight winners advance to Round 2A (winners)
 Eight losers move to Round 2B (Losers)

Second round

A. Winners
 Played by eight winners of Round 1
 Four winners advance to Quarter-finals
 Four losers move to Round 3

B. Losers
 Played by eight losers of Round 1
 Four winners move to Round 3

Third round
 Played by four losers of Round 2A & four winners of Round 2B
 Four winners advance to Quarter-finals

Quarter-finals
 Played by four winners of Round 2A and four winners of Round 3

Semi-finals

County Final

References

External links

Clare Senior Hurling Championship
Clare Senior Hurling Championship